Phaphund is a town and a nagar panchayat in Auraiya district in the Indian state of Uttar Pradesh.

Geography
It has an average elevation of 133 metres (436 feet).

Demographics
 India census, Phaphund had a population of 15,341. Males constitute 53% of the population and females 47%. Phaphund has an average literacy rate of 62%, higher than the national average of 59.5%: male literacy is 67%, and female literacy is 56%. In Phaphund, 18% of the population is under 6 years of age.

References

>>>...<<<

Cities and towns in Auraiya district